Cley Hill is a prominent hill to the west of Warminster in Wiltshire, England. Its summit has a commanding view of the Wiltshire / Somerset county boundary, at  elevation. The land is in Corsley parish and is owned by the National Trust.

A  area of chalk grassland at Cley Hill was notified as a biological Site of Special Scientific Interest in 1975. The land is managed by the National Trust, having been donated to the charity in 1954 by the 6th Marquess of Bath.

Archaeological features include a large univallate Iron Age hill fort, two bowl barrows and medieval strip lynchets.

There is a legend that the hill was formed by the devil, when he dropped a sack of earth with which he had planned to bury the town of Devizes. He had retrieved the earth from Somerset and was travelling to Devizes when he stopped to ask an old man the distance to the town. The man replied that he had been walking for years to reach Devizes, so the devil abandoned his plan.

References

External links

 Natural England website (SSSI information)
 SSSI boundary at Defras Magic Map website

Sites of Special Scientific Interest in Wiltshire
Sites of Special Scientific Interest notified in 1975
Hills of Wiltshire
Hill forts in Wiltshire
National Trust properties in Wiltshire
Scheduled monuments in Wiltshire